is a electoral district in the Japanese House of Representatives, the lower house of the National Diet. The district was established in 1994 as part of the general move from multi-member districts to single-member districts in the House of Representatives.

Areas Covered

Current District 
As of 2 February 2023, the areas covered by this district are as follows:

 Niigata (city)
 Minami
 Nishi
 Nishikan
 Sanjō
 Kamo
 Tsubame
 Nishikanbara District
 Minamikanbara District

As part of the 2022 redistricting, the wards of Niigata city would no longer be internally divided.

Areas from 2013-2022 
From the first redistricting in 2013, until the second redistricting in 2022, the areas covered by this district were as follows:

 Niigata (city)
 Parts of Minami (Former villages of Ajikata, Tsukigata and Nakanokuchi)
 Mikata and Tsukigata branch offices
 Parts of Nishi (Former towns of Maki and Nishikawa)
 Yotsugoya area
 Nishikan
 Nagaoka (Former towns of Koshiji, Mishima, Yoita, Teradomari Oguni and the former village of Washima)
 Areas of Nishitsu that were formerly apart of Koshiji,
 Kashiwazaki
 Tsubame
 Sado
 Nishikanbara District
 Santō District
 Kariwa District

As part of the 2013 redistricting, the district gained parts of Minami, Nishi and Nishikan wards from the 1st district and gained parts of the city of Nagaoka from the 5th district.

Areas from before 2013 
From the creation of the district in 1994 until the first redistricting in 2013, the areas covered by this district were as follows:

 Kashiwazaki
 Tsubame
 Ryōtsu
 Nishikanbara District
 Santo District
 Kariwa District
 Sado District

There was a small change in 2002 when the former town of Kurosaki in Nishinkanbara District was transferred to the 1st district, though the legal name of the town and county did not change.

History

Elected Representatives

Election Results 
‡ - Also ran in the Hokuriku Shinetsu PR election

‡‡ - Also ran and won in the Hokuriku Shinetsu PR election

Elections in the 2020s

Elections in the 2010s

Elections in the 2000s

Elections in the 1990s

References 

Districts of the House of Representatives (Japan)
Politics of Niigata Prefecture